Melo aethiopica, common name the crowned baler,  is a very large sea snail, a marine gastropod mollusc in the family Volutidae, the volutes.

Distribution
"Lesser Sunda Islands of Indonesia."

References

External links 

 

Volutidae
Gastropods described in 1758
Taxa named by Carl Linnaeus